In Greek mythology, Epiphron ( (Ancient Greek: Ἐπίφρων means 'prudence, care') was the daimon or spirit of prudence, shrewdness, thoughtfulness, carefulness, and sagacity. According to Hyginus, Epiphron was the son of Erebus (Darkness) and Nyx (Night).

Note

References 
 Gaius Julius Hyginus, Fabulae from The Myths of Hyginus translated and edited by Mary Grant. University of Kansas Publications in Humanistic Studies. Online version at the Topos Text Project.

Children of Nyx
Greek gods
Personifications in Greek mythology
Daimons
Wisdom gods